Niklaus Niggeler (3 May 1817, in Grossaffoltern – 26 May 1872) was a Swiss politician from the canton of Bern. He was President of the Swiss Council of States (1858/59) and of the National Council (1866).

External links 

1817 births
1872 deaths
People from Seeland District
Swiss Calvinist and Reformed Christians
Free Democratic Party of Switzerland politicians
Members of the Council of States (Switzerland)
Presidents of the Council of States (Switzerland)
Members of the National Council (Switzerland)
Presidents of the National Council (Switzerland)